Pular may refer to:

Pular language, a Fula language, spoken mainly in Guinea, West Africa
Pular (volcano), in Chile